Monch may refer to:
 Mönch, mountain in the Swiss Alps
 Erich Mönch
 Mönch (rock) climbing rock in Saxon Switzerland
 Monj, Razavi Khorasan village in Iran